The 1967 FIBA European Champions Cup Final Four was the concluding tournament of the 1966–67 FIBA European Champions Cup, and the last final four format until the new FIBA European Champions Cup Final Four era began in the late 1980s, with the 1988 FIBA European Champions Cup Final Four.

Real Madrid won its third FIBA European Champions Cup (EuroLeague) title.

Bracket

Final standings

Awards

FIBA European Champions Cup Finals Top Scorer
 Steve Chubin ( Simmenthal Milano)

1966–67 in European basketball
1983–84
1967 in Italian sport
1967 in Czechoslovak sport
1967 in Yugoslav basketball
1966–67 in Spanish basketball
International basketball competitions hosted by Spain